Stellaria is a genus of large sea snails, marine gastropod mollusks in the family Xenophoridae, the carrier shells.

Description
Shells medium-sized to large (diameter of base without attachments 65–128 mm; height of shell 48–70 mm), rather depressed to moderately high-spired, widely umbilicate, with wide peripheral flange (30-40% of total diameter at base) which is simple in some species or is digitate or divided into numerous long, hollow, narrow, parallel-sided spines. Ventral side of peripheral flange non-porcellanous. Foreign objects usually small to very small covering less than 30% of dorsal surface.

Species
Species within the genus Stellaria include:

Stellaria chinensis (Philippi, 1841)
Stellaria gigantea (Schepman, 1909)
Stellaria lamberti (Souverbie, 1871)
Stellaria solaris (Linnaeus, 1764) (type species of Stellaria)
Stellaria testigera (Bronn, 1831)
Stellaria testigera digitata von Martens, 1878
Stellaria testigera profunda Ponder, 1983

References

External links

Xenophoridae